Shipping (derived from the word relationship) is the desire by followers of a fandom for two or more people, either real-life people or fictional characters (in film, literature, television series, etc.), to be in a romantic or sexual relationship. It is considered a general term for fans' involvement with the ongoing character development of two people's character arcs in a work of fiction. Shipping often takes the form of unofficial creative works, including fanfiction stories and fan art, most often published on the Internet.

Etymology
The usage of the term "ship" in its relationship sense appears to have been originated around 1995 by Internet fans of the TV show The X-Files, who believed that the two main characters, Fox Mulder and Dana Scully, should be engaged in a romantic relationship. They called themselves "relationshippers" at first; then "R'shipper", and finally just "shipper".

The oldest recorded uses of the noun ship and the noun shipper, according to the Oxford English Dictionary, date back to 1996 postings on the Usenet group alt.tv.x-files; shipping is first attested slightly later, in 1997 and the verb to ship in 1998.

Notation and terminology
"Ship" and its derivatives in this context have since come to be in widespread usage. "Shipping" refers to the phenomenon; a "ship" is the concept of a fictional couple; to "ship" a couple means to have an affinity for it in one way or another; a "shipper" or a "fangirl/boy" is somebody significantly involved with such an affinity; and a "shipping war" is when two ships contradict each other, causing fans of each ship to argue. A ship that a particular fan prefers over all others is called an OTP, which stands for one true pairing.
 
When discussing shipping, a ship that has been confirmed by its series is called a canon ship or sailed ship, whereas a sunk ship is a ship that has been proven unable to exist in canon, or in other words, will never be real nor confirmed.

Naming conventions
Various naming conventions have developed in different online communities to refer to prospective couples, likely due to the ambiguity and cumbersomeness of the "Character 1 and Character 2" format. The first method deployed was using a slash, first used for Kirk/Spock. This is today mainly used for same-sex ships; fanfiction with these pairings is known as slash fiction. Name blending is often used to refer to a couple, like 'Reylo' for Kylo Ren and Rey in Star Wars franchise, 'Destiel' for Dean Winchester and Castiel in the Supernatural TV series, and 'Bubbline' referring to Princess Bubblegum and Marceline the Vampire Queen in Adventure Time. Portmanteaus and clipped compounds are used not only to abbreviate character pairings but also to create a name for the ship itself. For example, 'Klance' forms a clipped compound, and an abbreviated form of the complete names Keith and Lance in Voltron: Legendary Defender. 'Sculder' in this case Dana Scully and Fox Mulder in The X-Files, is an example of surnames being blended, although most X-Files fans use the term "MSR" (Mulder-Scully Relationship), as is "MoonBoon" to stand for Zarya Moonwolf and Kitty Boon in Mysticons. In other cases, first names of characters are merged, like the ships for Marcy Wu and Anne Boonchuy (Marcanne), Sasha Waybright and Marcy Wu (Sasharcy), and Sasha Waybright and Anne Boonchuy (Sashanne) in Amphibia. These combinations of names often follow systematic phonological principles, in which the first character in the ship’s name is seen as the ‘dominant’ partner. Japanese ship naming conventions often attach names together without slashing or blending by using an XY name-name format. This format is ruled by boy-girl ordering, or seme-uke (top-bottom) in Yaoi. In many East Asian countries there is a distinct difference between the pairing of XY and YX. Such as the pairing names of ‘MomoYuki’ (where Momo is dominant) vs. ‘YukiMomo’ (where Yuki is dominant) from the series Idolish7.

Many fandom-specific variants exist and often use fandom-specific terminology. These often employ words that describe the relationship between characters in the context of the fictional universe and simply add the word "Shipping" to the end. Other terminology include using a combination of the characters' names and codes as a ship name. For instance, ship names for characters in RWBY include "Bumbleby" (Blake Belladonna and Yang Xiao Long) and "White Rose" (Weiss Schnee and Ruby Rose).

Types of ships

Same-sex

Within shipping, same-sex pairings are popular; they are sometimes known as "slash and femslash". Within the anime/manga fandom, borrowed Japanese terms such as yaoi and yuri may be used. A person who supports same-sex pairings and reads or writes slash fiction may be referred to as a "slasher", although the Japanese term "fujoshi" for women who like same-sex stories, and "fudanshi" as the male equivalent of that, are also commonly used within the community, especially by fans of yaoi (boy on boy) and fans of yuri (girl on girl).

The term "slash" predates the use of "shipping" by at least some 20 years. It was originally coined as a term to describe a pairing of Kirk and Spock of Star Trek, Kirk/Spock (or "K/S"; sometimes spoken "Kirk-slash-Spock", whence "slash") homosexual fan fiction. Other early slash pairings came from characters in Starsky & Hutch and Dirty Harry." For a time in the late 1970s and early 1980s, "K/S" was used to describe such fan fiction, regardless of whether or not they were related to Star Trek, and eventually "slash" became a universal term to describe all homosexual-themed fan works. It now refers to a genre of fan fiction that focuses on romantic or sexual relationships between fictional characters of the same sex, Even so, the slash mark itself is a shorthand label for a romantic relationship, regardless of whether the pairing is heterosexual or homosexual, romantic, or erotic.

The first K/S stories were not immediately accepted by all Star Trek fans. Early slash fans in England feared that they would be arrested, because slash violated the obscenity laws there at the time. Many early slash stories were based on a pairing of two close friends, a "hero dyad", or "One True Pairing", such as Kirk/Spock or Starsky/Hutch; conversely, a classic pairing between foils was that of Blake/Avon from Blake's 7. With the advent of the Internet, slash fiction writers created mailing lists (which gradually took the place of amateur press associations (APA), and websites such as FanFiction.Net (which gradually started taking the place of zines). With the Internet, the number of fandoms represented increased dramatically, especially those devoted to science fiction, fantasy, and police dramas. The Internet also increased the level of reader interaction, making it easier for fans to comment on stories, give episode reviews, and discuss comment on trends in slash fandom itself. Websites and fanzines dedicated to fans of The X-Files, Stargate, Harry Potter, and Buffy the Vampire Slayer became common, with tens of thousands of slash stories available.

Due to the lack of canonical homosexual relationships in source media at the time that slash fiction began to emerge, some came to see slash fiction stories as being exclusively outside their respective canons and held that the term "slash fiction" applies only when the characters' same-sex romantic or erotic relationship about which an author writes is not part of the source's canon and that fan fiction about canonical same-sex relationships is therefore not slash. Femslash, a subgenre of slash fiction which focuses on romantic and/or sexual relationships between female fictional characters, on the other hand, are typically heterosexual in the canon universe, but when fictions focus on lesbian characters, the stories are often labeled as femslash for convenience. Original slash stories are those that contain male/male content, based on perceived homoerotic subtext between fictitious characters. This can be sourced from a variety of media content, such as manga, TV shows, movies and books amongst others. These works are now generally published online and use the same forms of rating, warnings and terminology that is commonly used by slash writers.

In May 2020, She-Ra and the Princesses of Power showrunner ND Stevenson said that while shipping has been a great tool for fans, they do not want films or shows with just occasional glances, or for all same-sex relationships to be portrayed as shipping. They argued that the Catra/Adora relationship in She-Ra and the Princesses of Power is not an example of shipping, since it is "central to the plot" of the story.

Polyamory
Love triangles are commonly used as a plot device to cause conflict in the story. The easy way around this is to pair all three together, or one member with both potential romantic partners. This is not to be confused with a harem, which is usually just a single character being sought out by many others. Situations such as that may be the one to cause a polyamorous relationship or characters may be in such a relationship. Polyamory is not always caused by love triangles, but those that don't tend to be less accepted by the fandom. In some fan fictions, characters are given a polyamorous identity, including warning "poly readers that the central characters are monogamous."

Interspecies
Interspecies shipping, which is usually displayed in fandoms of media consisting of animals of various species, is usually not problematic until a human is paired with a non-humanoid, sapient character. Shipping a human character with an animal or furry character can be controversial as it treads a contentious line with bestiality.

Age difference
Controversial age differences have a wide range. An elderly adult with a young adult, anyone with an immortal or slowly aging being, teenagers with young adults, or even ships involving fictional children are all part of this category. Connected to this are continued arguments about which ships are "best" and "right," with inevitable shipping wars.

Love-hate
Romances between two characters who canonically hate each other also occur. It is often interpreted that the characters share sexual tension between each other, having a love–hate relationship. An example would be pairing Daniel LaRusso and his bully and rival Johnny from The Karate Kid and Cobra Kai. This is one of the most popular types of shipping.

Notable fandoms

Daria fandom
Daria was marked throughout its run by shipper debate, primarily over whether the title character should have a relationship with Trent Lane. A common argument was that it would signal a turning away from the more subversive aspects of Daria's character, such as bitter criticism of romantic relationships.

In a later episode, Tom Sloane, who became Jane's boyfriend, is introduced, drawing a wedge between Jane and Daria, for instance. Daria and Tom warmed up to each other throughout the fourth season, leading up to its finale. With Jane and Tom's relationship in crisis, a heated argument between Daria and Tom led up to a kiss in Tom's car. In the TV movie Is it Fall Yet?, Daria decided to begin a relationship with Tom, and Daria and Jane patched up their friendship. This caused an uproar, and conversation turned to whether Tom was more appropriate than Trent had been. The debate was satirized by the show's writers in a piece on MTV's website.

In interviews done after the series' run, series co-creator Glenn Eichler revealed that "any viewer who really thought that Daria and Trent could [have] a relationship was just not watching the show we were making," Tom came about because "going into our fourth year... I thought it was really pushing credibility for Daria to have only had one or two dates during her whole high school career," and "teaser" episodes like "Pierce Me" were "intended to provide some fun for that portion of the audience that was so invested in the romance angle. The fact that those moments were few and far between should have given some indication that the series was not about Daria's love life."

Harry Potter fandom
The Harry Potter series' most contentious ship debates came from supporters of various potential pairings:

 Harry Potter and his close female friend Hermione Granger. In 2014, when interviewed by Emma Watson, author J.K. Rowling admitted to thinking she could have paired Hermione with Harry: "in some ways Hermione and Harry are a better fit", and that "Hermione's always there for Harry."
 Hermione ending up with Ron Weasley, close friend of both Harry and Hermione.
 Harry ending up with Ginny Weasley, Ron's younger sister. 
 Lily Evans ending up with either James Potter, or Severus Snape.
 Remus Lupin ending up with either Sirius Black or Nymphadora Tonks.
 Harry Potter and Draco Malfoy - 'Drarry'
 Hermione Granger and Draco Malfoy - 'Dramione'
 Ron Weasley and Ginny Weasley

Author J.K. Rowling appeared to tamp down the first possibility even before the debates got truly started following the release of Goblet of Fire in July 2000, when she stated in October 1999 that Harry and Hermione "are very platonic friends" after the release of Prisoner of Azkaban in July 1999. An interview with J.K. Rowling shortly after the release of Harry Potter and the Half-Blood Prince, in 2005 caused significant controversy within the fandom. An interviewer stated that Harry/Hermione fans were delusional, to which Rowling responded that they were "still valued members of her readership", but that there had been "anvil-sized hints" for future Ron/Hermione and Harry/Ginny relationships, incorporated in the book itself, and that Harry/Hermione shippers needed to re-read the books. This caused an uproar among Harry/Hermione shippers, some of whom claimed they would return their copies of Harry Potter and the Half-Blood Prince and boycott future Harry Potter books.

Rowling's attitude towards the shipping phenomenon has varied between amused and bewildered to frustrated. In that same interview, she stated that she was a "relative newcomer to the world of shipping" and that it was "extraordinary" to meet the shippers, calling it a "huge underworld" seething beneath her. Rowling stated in an interview in February 2014 in Wonderland Magazine, however, that she thought that realistically Hermione and Ron had "too much fundamental incompatibility," that they were written together "as a form of wish fulfillment" to reconcile a relationship she herself was once in. She went on to say that perhaps with marriage counseling Ron and Hermione would have been all right.

Xena: Warrior Princess fandom
The 1995–2001 action/fantasy TV series Xena: Warrior Princess produced "shipping wars," with spillover from real-world debates about homosexuality and gay rights. The show spawned various websites, online discussion forums, works of Xena fan fiction and several unofficial fan-made productions, with members of the fandom writing numerous fanfiction stories of the series, numbering in the thousands, and popularized the term altfic to refer to fanfiction about loving relationships between women.

Shortly after the series' debut, fans started discussing the possibility of a relationship between Xena and her sidekick and best friend Gabrielle. According to journalist Cathy Young, the quarrel between fans about a relationship between Xena and Gabrielle had a sociopolitical angle, in which some on the anti-relationship side were "undoubtedly driven by bona fide bigotry", while some on the pro-relationship side were lesbians who "approached the argument as a real-life gay rights struggle" in which "denying a sexual relationship between Xena and Gabrielle was tantamount to denying the reality of their own lives". She argued that the fact that staff paid attention to fan opinions may have led to problems, with an "incentive for the rival groups to out-shout one another to make themselves heard," leading to shipping wars.

In 2000, during the airing of the fifth season, the intensity of the "shipping wars" was chronicled (from a non-subtexter's point of view) in an article titled "The Discrimination in the Xenaverse" in the online Xena fan magazine Whoosh!, and numerous letters in response. The wars did not abate after the 2001 series finale. With no new material from the show itself, the debates were fueled by various statements from the cast and crew. In January 2003, Xena star Lucy Lawless told Lesbian News magazine that after watching the finale, she had come to believe that Xena and Gabrielle's relationship was "definitely gay". In March 2005, one-time Xena screenwriter Katherine Fugate, an outspoken supporter of the Xena/Gabrielle pairing, posted a statement on her website appealing for tolerance in the fandom, telling people to "allow everyone the grace to take what they need from the show and make it theirs," whether they see Xena with Gabrielle, or Xena with Ares. She also called for fans to "stop the arguing and name-calling".

Further reading
Downpour, a Fan fiction work shipping Team Fortress 2's Scout and Sniper characters.

See also
Larries, fans of shipping between Harry Styles and Louis Tomlinson of One Direction
Stucky (fandom), shipping between Marvel characters Steve Rogers and Bucky Barnes

References

Fandom
Internet culture
Romance